Harold Jay "Butch" Powers (October 8, 1900 – October 16, 1996) was the 36th Lieutenant Governor of California, having served from 1953–1959 under fellow liberal Republican Governor Goodwin Knight.

He died at the age of 96 in Modoc County, California in 1996.

Career
Powers was born in Eagleville, California. He was a rancher in Modoc County who owned many ranches in California, Nevada, and Idaho. First elected to the California State Senate in 1932, Powers represented Lassen, Modoc and Plumas counties. Powers served as President pro tempore of the Senate beginning in 1947.

In 1953, Powers became Lieutenant Governor of California, was elected to a full term in 1954, and served until 1959. In 1962, he ran for governor but withdrew due to the urging Republican leaders who supported Nixon. After he decided to quit campaigning for governor, Powers focused on rallying opposition to Nixon and to gain support for Democrat Edmund G. Brown.

Education
Powers obtained his degree from UC Davis.

References

Lieutenant Governors of California
1900 births
1996 deaths
20th-century American politicians
University of California, Davis alumni
Republican Party California state senators